Tabriz Vocational Museum — is a museum established in 2017 with the initiative of Tabrizian sculptor, writer and collector Reza Sarabi Agdam and demonstrates the historical professions of Azerbaijan. After three active years, the museum was closed on May 18, 2020, on International Museum Day due to financial problems caused by lack of Tabriz Municipality’s support leading into public anger and dissatisfaction.

About 
Tabriz Vocational Museum was established by the efforts of a sculptor, writer and collector named Reza Sarabi Agdam. The opening of the museum took place on May 11, 2017. The museum has exhibits reflecting the historical professions of Azerbaijan. Other exhibits include Thomas Edison's flashlight, an unparalleled collection of lanterns in the Middle East, a Timurid Koran, a map of the Gajar and Tsarist frontiers after the Turkmenchay Treaty, items from the Nazi German embassy, and weapons from various historical periods.

Closing of the museum 
For 3 years, the museum operated completely free of charge. Unfortunately, the museum was not supported by the state and officials over the years. The museum's founder, Reza Sarabi Agdam, said he had received only empty promises and encouragement from officials over the years. Although he received offers to sell his collections from several foreign countries and some major cities in Iran, the collector did not accept these offers. The Tabrizian collector, who collected old things and especially cameras with his own money without any help from any government agencies, was forced to collect exhibits from the Vocational Museum after 3 years because the municipality of Tabriz did not keep its promise to buy cameras. The museum was closed on May 18, 2020, International Museum Day. This incident caused public anger and discontent.

Gallery

See also 
 Hariree House
 Measure Museum
 Constitution House of Tabriz

References

External links 
 Tabriz Vocational Museum /

Museums in Tabriz